The Society of Cable Telecommunications Engineers or SCTE a subsidiary of CableLabs® is a non-profit professional association for accelerating the deployment of technology, technical standards and workforce development education related to cable telecommunications engineering and operations. Founded in 1969 as The Society of Cable Television Engineers, SCTE, has a current membership of more than 17,000 individuals.

As the applied science leader for cable telecommunications for over fifty years, SCTE takes innovative technology from idea to reality to drive real business results for its members. Through the development of technical standards and operational best practices, SCTE expedites the deployment of products and technologies in an ever-changing broadband landscape. And with our 60+ chapters, robust interactive, online training courses, in person hands-on training experiences, technical resources and professional certification programs, we make it possible to upskill and reskill your workforce at every level – from new technical employees to seasoned executives.

Publications 
SCTE a subsidiary of cablelabs offers several publications to its membership. These include Interval, a monthly member newsletter covering association events, training, activities, and member accomplishments, Broadband Library, a quarterly magazine, and SCTE Standards Bulletin, a quarterly printed newsletter covering the SCTE standards program.

Former publications included SCTE Credentials, a quarterly electronic newsletter highlighting SCTE's certification program.

Events 
SCTE Cable-Tec Expo is a four-day conference focused on engineering that includes educational workshops, exhibits, and professional networking opportunities.  During SCTE Cable-Tec Expo the technical formum is conducted in partnershop with CableLabs and the Internet & Television Association (NCTA). Annual attendance is approximately 10,000+ individuals.  SCTE Cable-Tec Expo is the largest telecommunication event in the Americas.  SCTE will celebrate its 40th anniversary in 2023.

Past and upcoming events
 SCTE Cable-Tec Expo 2010 October 20–22, 2010; New Orleans, Louisiana
 SCTE Cable-Tec Expo 2011 November 15–17, 2011; Atlanta, Georgia
 SCTE Cable-Tec Expo 2012 October 17–19, 2012; Orlando, Florida
 SCTE Cable-Tec Expo 2013 October 21–24, 2013; Atlanta, Georgia
 SCTE Cable-Tec Expo 2014 September 22–25, 2014; Denver, Colorado
 SCTE Cable-Tec Expo 2015 October 13–16, 2015; New Orleans, Louisiana
 SCTE Cable-Tec Expo 2016 September 26–29, 2016; Philadelphia, Pennsylvania
 SCTE Cable-Tec Expo 2017 October 17–20, 2017; Denver, Colorado
 SCTE Cable-Tec Expo 2018 October 22–25, 2018; Atlanta, Georgia
 SCTE Cable-Tec Expo 2019 September 30 - October 3, 2019; New Orleans, Louisiana
 SCTE Cable-Tec Expo 2020 October 12–15, 2020; Virtual
 SCTE Cable-Tec Expo 2021 October 11–15, 2021; Virtual
 SCTE Cable-Tec Expo 2022 September 19–23, 2023; Philadelphia, Pennsylvania
 SCTE Cable-Tec Expo 2023 October 16–19, 2023; Denver, Colorado

Standards program 
SCTE includes a standards program for the development of technical specifications supporting the cable telecommunications industry. The work program includes: data and telephony over cable; application platform development; digital video; emergency alert systems (EMS); energy management; network monitoring systems; cables, connectors and amplifiers; and construction and maintenance practices.  In 2016 SCTE  created an Internet of Things working group within the standards program.  A Generic access platform (GAP) working group was created in 2018.

SCTE is accredited by the American National Standards Institute (ANSI), recognized by the International Telecommunication Union (ITU), and works in cooperation with the European Telecommunications Standards Institute (ETSI). More than 130 MSOs, vendors and allied organizations are SCTE Standards members.

Awards 
SCTE was announced in 2011 as a recipient of a Technology & Engineering Emmy Award from the National Academy of Television Arts & Sciences for “Local Cable Ad Insertion Technology – Cable Digital Standards for Local Cable Advertising.”

References

External links 
 The Society of Cable Telecommunications Engineers

Professional certification in engineering
Television organizations